Laholm Municipality (Laholms kommun) is a municipality in Halland County in southwest Sweden. The seat is located in Laholm.

The amalgamation process during the local government reform in the 1970s took place in two steps. In 1971 the City of Laholm merged with two rural municipalities forming the unitary municipality and three years later four more units were added.

Localities 
There are 14 urban areas (also called a Tätort or locality) in Laholm Municipality.

In the table the localities are listed according to the size of the population as of December 31, 2010. The municipal seat is in bold characters.

Elections
Below are the results listed since the 1973 municipal reform. Between 1988 and 1998 the Sweden Democrats' results were not published by the SCB due to the party's small size nationwide. "Turnout" denotes the percentage of the electorate casting a ballot, but "Votes" only applies to valid ballots cast.

Riksdag

Blocs

This lists the relative strength of the socialist and centre-right blocs since 1973, but parties not elected to the Riksdag are inserted as "other", including the Sweden Democrats results from 1988 to 2006, but also the Christian Democrats pre-1991 and the Greens in 1982, 1985 and 1991. The sources are identical to the table above. The coalition or government mandate marked in bold formed the government after the election. New Democracy got elected in 1991 but are still listed as "other" due to the short lifespan of the party. "Elected" is the total number of percentage points from the municipality that went to parties who were elected to the Riksdag.

Pictures

References 

Statistics Sweden

External links 

Laholm Municipality - Official site

Municipalities of Halland County